Kresilas ( Krēsílas; c. 480 – c. 410 BC) was a Greek sculptor in the Classical period (5th century BC), from Kydonia. He was trained in Argos and then worked in Athens at the time of the Peloponnesian War, as a follower of the idealistic portraiture of Myron. He is best known for his statue Pericles with the Corinthian helmet.

Biography
Kresilas hailed from the city-state of Kydonia, on the island of Crete.  He was trained in Argos as a student of Dorotheos, with whom he worked at Delphi and Hermione. Between 450 and 420 BC he worked mainly in Athens, as a follower of Myron's school and in the post-Phidias period he brought elements of compactness due to the Peloponnesian period.

Roman writer Pliny the Elder wrote of a competition between the four sculptors Polykleitos, Phidias, Kresilas, and Phradmon, on the best statues of Amazons for the Temple of Artemis at Ephesus. Each sculptor placed himself at first place, but Phidias, Kresilas, and Phradmon had all put Polykleitos at second place, thus, Polykleitos won, Pheidias came second, and Kresilas third.

Work

In Athens he created, for example, a bronze statue of Pericles (440–430 BC) with the Corinthian helmet upon the head as a sign of his position as strategos. Pliny the Elder said of it: "a work worthy of the title; it is a marvellous thing about this art that it can make famous men even more famous". Its base was found in the Athenian Acropolis; it was doubtless the bronze that Pausanias saw there (Pausanias I.25.1, I.28.2). It seems the series of Pericles portrait busts derive from it, of which there are examples at the Vatican Museums, British Museum (found at Hadrian's Villa at Tivoli, and owned by Charles Townley) and Altes Museum.

Kresilas also created the wounded men and a dying Amazon for Ephesus in concurrence (in a competition with Phidias and Polykleitos), possibly the model for many copies, one of which is the wounded Amazon of Kresilas (volnerata; Pliny, Nat. Hist. xxxiv. 75) in the Vatican Museums. He has also been identified as the originator of the Velletri type of Athena statue (Athena of Velletri). He created a Diomedes statue according to Homer's description.

"Cresilla"
In 1804 CE, Kresilas was mistakenly identified as a woman named "Cresilla"  by Matilda Betham, who thought "she" had placed third behind Polykleitos and Phidias in a competition to sculpt seven Amazons for the Temple of Artemis at Ephesus. As a result, Kresilas was mistakenly included in artist Judy Chicago's symbolic history of women in Western civilization, The Dinner Party.

References

Sources
 Furtwängler, Adolf, Masterpieces of Greek Sculpture: A Series of Essays on the History of Art, Volume 2, Charles Scribner's Sons, 1895.
 Hurwit, Jeffrey M., Artists and Signatures in Ancient Greece, Cambridge University Press, 2015. .
 Metropolitan Museum of Art (New York, N.Y.), Philippe De Montebello, The Metropolitan Museum of Art Guide, Metropolitan Museum of Art, 1994. .
 Pliny. Natural History, Volume IX: Books 33–35. Translated by H. Rackham. Loeb Classical Library 394. Cambridge, MA: Harvard University Press, 1952.
 Politt, J. J., The Art of Ancient Greece: Sources and Documents, Cambridge University Press, 1990. .

External links

 The wounded Amazon of Kresilas
Picture of an Amazon (in German)
Busts of Pericles

5th-century BC Greek sculptors
Ancient Greek sculptors
Ancient Cydonians
Ancient Cretan sculptors
Metics in Classical Athens
Acropolis of Athens
480s BC births
410s BC deaths